Commissioned survey and research vessels of the Royal New Zealand Navy from its formation on 1 October 1941 to the present:

See also
 Current Royal New Zealand Navy ships
 List of ships of the Royal New Zealand Navy
 History of research ships

References
 Walters, Sydney David (1956) The Royal New Zealand Navy: Official History of World War II, Department of Internal Affairs, Wellington Online
 McDougall, R J  (1989) New Zealand Naval Vessels. Page 115–123.Government Printing Office. 
 Royal New Zealand Navy Official web site

External links
 Hydrography in New Zealand
 Hydrography in New Zealand2
 Hydrographic surveying

 
Military history of New Zealand
Royal New Zealand Navy